Sunn Amps and Smashed Guitars is a live album by Earth, originally released in 1995 by Blast First Records. It contained the track "Ripped on Fascist Ideas" (recorded in London, May 1995). It was re-released in 2001 by No Quarter Records with four bonus tracks taken from a 1990 demo. Kurt Cobain and Kelly Canary contribute guest vocals on the track "Divine and Bright".

Track listing

Personnel
Dylan Carlson – vocals, guitar
Ian Dickson - Bass Guitar, Guitar on 'Ripped On Fascist Ideas'
Dave Harwell – bass guitar
Joe Preston – bass guitar, drum machine
Kurt Cobain – guest vocals on "Divine and Bright"
Kelly Canary – guest vocals on "Divine and Bright"

References

Earth (American band) live albums
Kurt Cobain
1995 live albums